UDP-2,3-diacylglucosamine diphosphatase (UDP-2,3-diacylglucosamine hydrolase, UDP-2,3-diacylglucosamine pyrophosphatase, ybbF (gene), lpxH (gene)) is an enzyme with systematic name UDP-2,3-bis((3R)-3-hydroxymyristoyl)-alpha-D-glucosamine 2,3-bis((3R)-3-hydroxymyristoyl)-beta-D-glucosaminyl 1-phosphate phosphohydrolase. This enzyme catalyses the following chemical reaction

 UDP-2,3-bis[(3R)-3-hydroxymyristoyl]-alpha-D-glucosamine + H2O  2,3-bis[(3R)-3-hydroxymyristoyl]-beta-D-glucosaminyl 1-phosphate + UMP

The enzyme catalyses a step in the biosynthesis of lipid A.

References

External links 
 

EC 3.6.1